Giuseppe Bazzani (23 September 1690 – 17 August 1769) was an Italian painter of the Rococo.

Biography
Born in Mantua to a goldsmith, Giovanni Bazzani, early on he apprenticed with the Parmesan painter Giovanni Canti (1653–1715). A fellow pupil was Francesco Maria Raineri. He spent most of his life in Mantua. From 1752, he was faculty, and from 1767, director of the Accademia di Belle Arti of Mantua.

While ensconced in a declining provincial city, he absorbed international influences. His loose brushstrokes, fervid and often dark emotionalism, and tortured poses, which recall at times later expressionism, display stylistic tendencies more typical of Lombardy. Numerous artists, including Fetti, Bencovich, Rubens, and Magnasco are said to have influenced him, although the number and diversity of the artists suggested hints that he had an idiosyncratic and unique synthesis for his time.

Among his early works are paintings of the Miracles of Pius V, the Conversion of a Heretic and the Healing of a Madwoman (all mid-1720s; Mantua, Museum of the Ducal Palace of Mantua), initially painted for the church of Saint Maurice in Mantua. He painted depictions of the evangelists St. John, St. Mark and St. Luke (all late 1720s) for the parish church of Vasto di Goito. He painted the Baptism, the Ecstasy of St. Aloysius Gonzaga and the Ecstasy of Saints Francis & Anthony (1732) for the parish church of Borgoforte. Seven canvases depicting the Life of Alexander the Great were painted for Giacomo Biondi, one of the artist's early patrons. His altarpiece of St Romuald's Vision, initially painted for the church of San Marco, but now in Diocesan Museum of Mantua, the saint, book in hand, has a dream in which he sees his fellow Benedictine monks ascending to heaven in a clumsy, touching, human parade up a staircase instead of a mystical Jacob's ladder. The painting merges a mixture of mystical vision and stylized empiric observation. The nineteenth-century art historian Carlo D'Arco was unconvinced about this brash new style, and said of Bazzani's work that "(he) wanted always to always use a great force of genius ...and most of his works appear as if unperfected sketches and immature conceptions that are drowning and convulsing in mannered styles."

The painter Domenico Conti Bazzani (1740–1815) was his pupil and adopted son, and became a prominent Neoclassical painter in Rome.

References

Web Gallery of Art biography on Bazzani.

Anthology

1690 births
1769 deaths
17th-century Italian painters
Italian male painters
18th-century Italian painters
Painters from Mantua
Italian Baroque painters
Rococo painters
Catholic painters
18th-century Italian male artists